Roll Flight was a German aircraft manufacturer founded by Martin Rütter based in Schwelm. The company specialized in the design and manufacture of powered parachutes in the form of ready-to-fly aircraft for the European Fédération Aéronautique Internationale microlight category.

Active in the mid-2000s period, the company started building steel tube cages for paramotors as its first product. This then expanded into producing entire powered parachute carriage units which could then be mated with one of a number of parachute wings. The company produced the Roll Flight MR V as a single-seater that could be converted into a two-seater and was then called the Duo.

Aircraft

References

Defunct aircraft manufacturers of Germany
Ultralight aircraft
Homebuilt aircraft
Powered parachutes